Air Marshal Anil Khosla, PVSM, AVSM, VM, ADC is a retired Indian air force officer who served as 42nd Vice Chief of the Air Staff (VCAS) of the Indian Air Force. He assumed the office on 1 October 2018 and handed over on 30 April 2019.

Early life and education 
Khosla is an alumnus of National Defence Academy, Pune and National Defence College, New Delhi. He is a post-graduate from Defense Service Staff College, Wellington and has two MPhil degrees in defence studies. He also attended a higher command course at the Army War College, Mhow and was awarded the Commandants medal. In addition, he attended a senior defence management course at College of Defence Management, Secunderabad.

Career 
Khosla was commissioned into the fighter stream of the Indian Air Force in December 1979. He has clocked over 4000 hours of flying on different aircraft like SEPECAT Jaguar, MiG-21 and HAL Kiran. He has experience in both ground attack and air defence roles and specializes in maritime role. He is also an A2 category flying instructor and a fighter strike leader.

He has commanded a SEPECAT Jaguar squadron assigned to a maritime role and two IAF frontline bases, Jaisalmer AFS and Ambala AFS. He has held other key posts as well including, Principal Director at Directorate of Information and Electronic Warfare; Director in Personnel branch;  Joint Director at Directorate of Concept Studies; Air Officer Commanding HQ Maritime Air Operations; Air Officer Commanding J&K Area; Senior Air Staff Officer (SASO), Central Air Command; Director General Air (Operations), Air HQ and Director General (Inspection & Safety), Air HQ and Air Officer Commanding-in-Chief (AOC-in-C), Eastern Air Command (1 January 2017 - 30 September 2018).

Awards and medals 
Khosla has been awarded several medals. He stood first in the order of merit of all the attended courses namely: Flying Instructors course, Fighter Strike leaders course, Junior command course and Staff course. He was also awarded Commandants medal for higher command course at Army war college. He is recipient of   AOC-in-C commendation (as flying cadet for force landing HT -2 ac during solo) and  CAS commendation. Presidential awards include the Ati Vishisht Seva Medal, the Vayu Sena Medal and the Param Vishisht Seva Medal (2018).

Military Awards

Personal life 
Khosla is married to Mrs Deepshikha Khosla and has two sons. He is a keen golfer and billiards/Snooker player. He is a national level puzzle solver and has participated in Sudoku nationals for the last nine years.

References 

1959 births
Living people
Vice Chiefs of Air Staff (India)
Recipients of the Vayu Sena Medal
Recipients of the Ati Vishisht Seva Medal
Recipients of the Param Vishisht Seva Medal
National Defence College, India alumni
College of Defence Management alumni
National Defence Academy (India) alumni
Army War College, Mhow alumni
Defence Services Staff College alumni